The women's 'Soft Styles with Weapons' category involved eight contestants from five countries across two continents - Europe and North America.  Each contestant went through seven performances (2 minutes each) with the totals added up at the end of the event.  The gold medal winner was Ekaterina Chizhikova from Russia with compatriot Elena Chirkova gaining silver.  Veronika Dombrovskaya from Belarus claimed the bronze medal spot.

Results

See also
List of WAKO Amateur World Championships
List of WAKO Amateur European Championships
List of female kickboxers

References

External links
 WAKO World Association of Kickboxing Organizations Official Site

Kickboxing events at the WAKO World Championships 2007 Coimbra
2007 in kickboxing
Kickboxing in Portugal